Tanit (Punic: 𐤕𐤍𐤕 Tīnīt) was a Carthaginian goddess. She was the chief deity of Carthage alongside her consort Baal-Hamon.

Tanit is also called Tinnit. The name appears to have originated in Carthage (modern day Tunisia), though it does not appear in local theophorous names. She was equivalent to the war goddess Astarte, and later worshipped in Roman Carthage in her Romanized form as Dea Caelestis, Juno Caelestis, or simply Caelestis.

Similarly, Algerian, Tunisian and many other spoken forms of Arabic refer to " farming" to refer to non-irrigated agriculture. Such usage is attested in Hebrew, a Canaanite language sister to Phoenician, already in the 2nd century CE Mishnah.

Tanit or Tinnīt? 
Until 1955 the name of the goddess was only known in Phoenician characters, as TNT (written without vowels). It was vocalized, quite arbitrarily, as "Tanit". Then in 1955 Punic inscriptions, found at El-Hofra (Constantine, Algeria) and written in Greek characters, were published, that included the fully vocalized name as Θινιθ (Thinith) and Θεννειθ (Thenneith). This made clear that the name should be pronounced as Tinnīt. However, the spelling Tanit is still often encountered.

Worship 

Tanit was worshiped in Punic contexts in the Western Mediterranean, in Sicily, Malta, North Africa, Gades and many other places into Hellenistic times.

Tanit's worship might have originated in relation to the Phoenician deity Astarte (Ishtar), whose own worship is first dated in the Phoenician sites of Sidon and Tyre. Her shrine excavated at Sarepta in southern Phoenicia revealed an inscription that has been speculated to identify her for the first time in her homeland and related her securely to the Phoenician goddess Astarte (Ishtar). Iconographic portrayals of both deities later become similar. The relation between both deities has been proposed to be hypostatic in nature, representing two aspects of the same goddess.

From the fifth century BCE onwards, Tanit's worship is associated with that of Baal Hammon. In North Africa, where the inscriptions and material remains are more plentiful, she was, as well as a consort of Baal Hammon, a heavenly goddess of war, a "virginal" (unmarried) mother goddess and nurse, and, less specifically, a symbol of fertility, as are most female forms. Tanit worship became popular in the Tyrian colony of Carthage, especially after the separation between Carthage and Tyre in the fifth century, when the traditional Phoenician cults of Astarte and Melqart were displaced by the Punic worship of Tanit and Baal Hammon.

Several of the major Greek goddesses were identified with Tanit by the syncretic interpretatio graeca, which recognized as Greek deities in foreign guise the gods of most of the surrounding non-Hellene cultures.

Phoenicians spread the cult of Tanit-Astarte to the Iberian Peninsula with the foundation of Gadir (modern day Cádiz) and other colonies, where the goddess might have been also assimilated to native deities. Her worship was still active after the Roman conquest, when she was integrated with the Roman goddess Juno (along with elements from Diana and Minerva) in a goddess named Dea Caelestis, the same way Baal Hammon was assimilated to Saturn. Dea Caelestis retained Punic traits until the end of the Classical period in the fourth century. Ancient Berbers of North Africa also adopted the Punic cult of Tanit.

Iconography

Her symbol (the sign of Tanit), found on many ancient stone carvings, appears as a trapezium closed by a horizontal line at the top and surmounted in the middle by a circle; the horizontal arm is often terminated either by two short upright lines at right angles to it or by hooks. Later, the trapezium was frequently replaced by an isosceles triangle. The symbol is interpreted by Danish professor of Semitic philology F. O. Hvidberg-Hansen as a woman raising her hands. She is also represented by the crescent moon and the Venus symbol.

Like Astarte, Tanit is often depicted naked, as a symbol of sexuality, and riding a lion or having a lion's head herself, showing her warrior quality. She is also depicted winged, possibly under influence of Egyptian artwork of Isis. Her associated animal and plants are the lion, the dove, the palm tree and the rose. Another motif assimilates her to Europa, portraying Tanit as a woman riding a bull that would represent another deity, possibly El.

Child sacrifice

The origins of Tanit are to be found in the pantheon of Ugarit, especially in the Ugaritic goddess Anat (Hvidberg-Hansen 1982). There is significant, albeit disputed, evidence, both archaeological and within ancient written sources, pointing towards child sacrifice forming part of the worship of Tanit and Baal Hammon.

Some archaeologists theorized that infant sacrifices have occurred. Lawrence E. Stager, who directed the excavations of the Carthage Tophet in the 1970s, believes that infant sacrifice was practiced there. Paolo Xella of the National Research Council in Rome summarized the textual, epigraphical, and archaeological evidence for Carthaginian infant sacrifice.

Archaeological evidence

 is a Hebrew term from the Bible, used to refer to a site near Jerusalem at which Canaanites and Israelites who strayed from Judaism by practicing Canaanite idolatry were said to sacrifice children. It is now used as a general term for all such sites with cremated human and animal remains. The Hebrew Bible does not specify that the Israelite victims were buried, only burned, although the "place of burning" was probably adjacent to the place of burial. We have no idea how the Phoenicians themselves referred to the places of burning or burial, or to the practice itself.

Several apparent tophets have been identified, chiefly a large one in Carthage, dubbed the Tophet of Salammbó, after the neighbourhood where it was unearthed in 1921. Soil in the Tophet of Salammbó was found to be full of olive wood charcoal, probably from the sacrificial pyres. It was the location of the temple of the goddess Tanit and the necropolis. Animal remains, mostly sheep and goats, found inside some of the Tophet urns, strongly suggest that this was not a burial ground for children who died prematurely. The animals were sacrificed to the gods, presumably in place of children (one surviving inscription refers to the animal as "a substitute"). It is conjectured that the children unlucky enough not to have substitutes were also sacrificed and then buried in the Tophet. The remains include the bodies of both very young children and small animals, and those who argue in favor of child sacrifice have argued that if the animals were sacrificed then so too were the children. The area covered by the Tophet in Carthage was probably over an acre and a half by the fourth century BCE, with nine different levels of burials. About 20,000 urns were deposited between 400 BCE and 200 BCE, with the practice continuing until the early years of the Christian period. The urns contained the charred bones of newborns and in some cases the bones of fetuses and two-year-olds. These double remains have been interpreted to mean that in the cases of stillborn babies, the parents would sacrifice their youngest child.

A detailed breakdown of the age of the buried children includes pre-natal individuals – that is, still births. It is also argued that the age distribution of remains at this site is consistent with the burial of children who died of natural causes, shortly before or after birth. Sergio Ribichini has argued that the Tophet was "a child necropolis designed to receive the remains of infants who had died prematurely of sickness or other natural causes, and who for this reason were "offered" to specific deities and buried in a place different from the one reserved for the ordinary dead". He adds that this was probably part of "an effort to ensure the benevolent protection of the same deities for the survivors." However, this analysis is disputed; Patricia Smith and colleagues from the Hebrew University and Harvard University show from the teeth and skeletal analysis at the Carthage Tophet that infant ages at death (about two months) do not correlate with the expected ages of natural mortality (perinatal).

Cultural references
In Gustave Flaubert's historical novel Salammbô (1862), the title character is a priestess of Tanit. Mâtho, the chief male protagonist, a Libyan mercenary rebel at war with Carthage, breaks into the goddess's temple and steals her veil.

In Kate Elliott's Spiritwalker trilogy, a romanticised version of Tanit is one of many deities commonly worshiped in a polytheistic Europa. The narrator, Catherine, frequently appeals to "Blessed Tanit, Protector of Women", and the goddess occasionally appears to her.

G. K. Chesterton refers to Tanit in his account of the Punic Wars, "War of the Gods and Demons" (a chapter of his book The Everlasting Man). Describing the cultural shock of foreign armies invading Italy when Hannibal crossed the Alps, Chesterton wrote:

In Margaret Atwood's The Blind Assassin there is an epigraph on a Carthaginian funerary urn that reads: "I swam, the sea was boundless, I saw no shore. / Tanit was merciless, my prayers were answered. / O you who drown in love, remember me."

In John Maddox Roberts's alternate history novel Hannibal's Children, in which the Carthaginians won the Second Punic War, one of the characters is Princess Zarabel, leader of the cult of Tanit.

Isaac Asimov's 1956 science fiction short story "The Dead Past" tells of Arnold Potterley, a professor of ancient history, who is obsessed with exonerating the Carthaginians of child sacrifice and tries to gain access to the chronoscope, a device which allows direct observation of past events. Eventually, Potterley's obsession with the Carthaginian past has far-reaching effects on the society of the present.

Given name

In modern times the name, often with the spelling Tanith, has been used as a female given name, both for real people and in fiction.

See also 

Aicha Kandicha
Ankh
Ishtar
Isis

Notes

References

External links

 Limestone stela with images of the goddess Tanit

Carthaginian mythology
Lunar goddesses
War goddesses
Fertility goddesses
West Semitic goddesses
Phoenician mythology
Berber goddesses
Astarte
Lion deities